Claude-Jean-François Despréaux was a French musician and revolutionary, born in the 1740s and died in Paris on 11 August 1794.

Biography 
The son of Jean-François Despréaux, oboist of the Académie royale de musique who retired in 1767, and Marie-Anne d'Arras, Louis-Félix's older brother (1746-1813) and Jean-Étienne Despréaux, Despréaux made his debut in 1759 as violinist. After he became head of the concertmasters in 1771, he retired in 1782.

Desperate following the Fall of Maximilien Robespierre, he committed suicide with a shotgun in his apartment, at 20 rue du Sentier, on 24 thermidor an II (11 August 1794).

He is the author of several sonatas for violin and harpsichord.

References 

18th-century French male classical violinists
Maximilien Robespierre
Year of birth missing
1794 deaths
Suicides by firearm in France
18th-century suicides
Concertmasters